Fentrell Cypress is an American football cornerback for the Florida State Seminoles. He played for the Virginia Cavaliers football team from 2020 to 2022. After the 2022 season, Cyress entered the NCAA transfer portal.  He is rated by 247Sports as the No. 2 player currently in the portal.

References

External links
 Virginia Cavaliers bio

Living people
American football cornerbacks
Virginia Cavaliers football players
People from Rock Hill, South Carolina
Players of American football from South Carolina
Year of birth missing (living people)
Florida State Seminoles football players